Region 9 of the National Junior College Athletic Association (NJCAA) consists of 17 colleges from Colorado, Montana, Nebraska, and Wyoming.

Member schools

Current members

Colorado Community College Athletic Conference
The CCCAC currently has five full members, all are public schools:

Notes

Nebraska Community College Athletic Conference
The NCCAC currently has five full members, all are public schools:

Notes

Wyoming Community College Athletic Conference
The WCCAC currently has six full members, all are public schools:

Notes

Independents
The NJCAA Region 9 currently has one full member that is not affiliated with an athletic conference, which is also a public school:

Notes

Former members
The NJCAA Region 9 had four former full members, all were public schools:

Notes

See also
National Junior College Athletic Association (NJCAA)
NJCAA Region 8
NJCAA Region 23

External links
NJCAA Region 9 website
NJCAA Website

National Junior College Athletic Association